Mike may refer to:

Animals
 Mike (cat), cat and guardian of the British Museum
 Mike the Headless Chicken, chicken that lived for 18 months after his head had been cut off
 Mike (chimpanzee), a chimpanzee featured in several books and documentaries

Arts
 Mike (miniseries), a 2022 Hulu limited series based on the life of American boxer Mike Tyson
 Mike (2022 film), a Malayalam film produced by John Abraham
 Mike (album), an album by Mike Mohede
 Mike (1926 film), an American film
 Mike (musician), American rapper, songwriter and record 
 Mike (novel), a 1909 novel by P. G. Wodehouse
 "Mike" (song), by Elvana Gjata and Ledri Vula featuring John Shahu
 Mike (Twin Peaks), a character from Twin Peaks
 "Mike", a song by Xiu Xiu from their 2004 album Fabulous Muscles

Businesses
 Mike (cellular network), a defunct Canadian cellular network
 Mike and Ike, a candies brand

Military 
 MIKE Force, a unit in the Vietnam War
 Ivy Mike, the first test of a full-scale thermonuclear weapon

Technology
 Microphone
 Micrometer (device)
 MIKE2.0 methodology, open source delivery methodology for enterprise information management consultants

Other uses
 Mike (given name)
 The letter "M" in the NATO phonetic alphabet
 Mike, Missouri, a community in the United States
 Middle linebacker, a position in American football

See also
 Mikes (disambiguation)
 Doctor Mike (disambiguation)
 Like Mike (disambiguation)